In thermochemistry, the enthalpy of solution (heat of solution or enthalpy of solvation) is the enthalpy change associated with the dissolution of a substance in a solvent at constant pressure resulting in infinite dilution.

The enthalpy of solution is most often expressed in kJ/mol at constant temperature. The energy change can be regarded as being made of three parts: the endothermic breaking of bonds within the solute and within the solvent, and the formation of attractions between the solute and the solvent. An ideal solution has a null enthalpy of mixing. For a non-ideal solution it is an excess molar quantity.

Energetics
Dissolution by most gases is exothermic. That is, when a gas dissolves in a liquid solvent, energy is released as heat, warming both the system (i.e. the solution) and the surroundings. 

The temperature of the solution eventually decreases to match that of the surroundings. The equilibrium, between the gas as a separate phase and the gas in solution, will by Le Châtelier's principle shift to favour the gas going into solution as the temperature is decreased (decreasing the temperature increases the solubility of a gas). 

When a saturated solution of a gas is heated, gas comes out of solution.

Steps in dissolution
Dissolution can be viewed as occurring in three steps:
 Breaking solute-solute attractions (endothermic), see for instance lattice energy  in salts.
 Breaking solvent-solvent attractions (endothermic), for instance that of hydrogen bonding
 Forming solvent-solute attractions (exothermic), in solvation.

The value of the enthalpy of solvation is the sum of these individual steps.

Dissolving ammonium nitrate in water is endothermic.  The energy released by solvation of the ammonium ions and nitrate ions is less than the energy absorbed in breaking up the ammonium nitrate ionic lattice and the attractions between water molecules. Dissolving potassium hydroxide is exothermic, as more energy is released during solvation than is used in breaking up the solute and solvent.

Expressions in differential or integral form
The expressions of the enthalpy change of dissolution can be differential or integral, as function of the ratio of amounts solute-solvent.

The molar differential enthalpy change of dissolution is:

where  is the infinitesimal variation or differential of mole number of the solute during dissolution.

The integral heat of dissolution is defined for a process of obtaining a certain amount of solution with a final concentration. The enthalpy change in this process, normalized by the mole number of solute, is evaluated as the molar integral heat of dissolution. Mathematically, the molar integral heat of dissolution is denoted as:

The prime heat of dissolution is the differential heat of dissolution for obtaining an infinitely diluted solution.

Dependence on the nature of the solution
The enthalpy of mixing of an ideal solution is zero by definition but the enthalpy of dissolution of nonelectrolytes has the value of the enthalpy of fusion or vaporisation. For non-ideal solutions of electrolytes it is connected to the activity coefficient of the solute(s) and the temperature derivative of the relative permittivity through the following formula:

See also
 Apparent molar property
 Enthalpy of mixing
 Heat of dilution
 Heat of melting
 Hydration energy
 Lattice energy
 Law of dilution
 Solvation
 Thermodynamic activity
 Solubility equilibrium

References

External links
phase diagram

Solutions
Enthalpy